Double-barrelled or double-barreled (with or without hyphens) may refer to:

 Double-barrelled name, a type of surname 
 Double-barreled question, an improper formulation of a question 
 Double Barrelled Soul, 1967 album by Brother Jack McDuff and David Newman

Guns
 Multiple-barrel firearm 
 Double-barreled cannon
 Double-barreled shotgun
 Double-Barreled Wheellock Pistol Made for Emperor Charles V

See also 
 Double Barrel (disambiguation)